Johnen is the surname of an extended family that originally comes from the region of Aachen in Germany.

Origin

The family name is derived from the name John. The name John in turn is a Hebrew from the homonymous nickname origin Johannes (Heb. "Yahweh has bestowed thy Grace") shows previous name.

The name John gained early in the Christian world wide recognition and dissemination, primarily through John the Baptist, in addition also by the Apostle and Evangelist John.

Notable people with the name include
Anna Gisela Johnen (1925–2014), German professor of zoology
Christian Johnen (1862–1938), German jurist and stenography scientist
Colette Johnen,  French professor of mathematics at the University of Bordeaux
Dietmar Johnen (born 1965), German politician (Alliance '90 / The Greens)
Hans Johnen (1940–2013), German professor of mathematics
Heinz-Gregor Johnen (1933–2012), German entrepreneur
Hermann-Victor Johnen (born 1955), German entrepreneur, economic historian and visiting professor at the University of Berkeley in California.
Kurt Johnen (1884–1965), a professor of musicology 
Kurt Johnen (1944), author and professor of German Aesthetics and Communication
Leo Johnen (1901–1989), German politician (GB / BHE)
Matthias Joseph Johnen (1817–1906), German priest
Paul Johnen (1922–2005), German local politician and mayor of the city Monschau from 1966 to 1978.
Thomas Johnen (born 1964), German theologian and professor of Romance philology
Wilhelm Johnen (Politiker) (1902–1980), German politician (CDU) and companion of the first post-world war two Chancellor of Germany Konrad Adenauer
Wilhelm Johnen (1921–2002), German airforce pilot awarded with the Knight's Cross of the Iron Cross
Wilhelm Johnen (psychologist), (born 1950), German psychologist and author.

Notes 

German-language surnames